A dropout is a momentary loss of signal in a communications system, usually caused by noise, propagation anomalies, or system malfunctions.  For analog signals, a dropout is frequently gradual and partial, depending on the cause.  For digital signals, dropouts are more pronounced, usually being sudden and complete, due to the cliff effect.  In mobile telephony, a dropout of more than a few seconds will result in a dropped call.

References

Communication